Voore may refer to:

 Voore, Jõgeva County, a village in Saare Parish
 Voore, Lääne-Viru County, a village in Vinni Parish